This is a list of articles about prime numbers. A prime number (or prime) is a natural number greater than 1 that has no positive divisors other than 1 and itself. By Euclid's theorem, there are an infinite number of prime numbers. Subsets of the prime numbers may be generated with various formulas for primes. The first 1000 primes are listed below, followed by lists of notable types of prime numbers in alphabetical order, giving their respective first terms. 1 is neither prime nor composite.

The first 1000 prime numbers 
The following table lists the first 1000 primes, with 20 columns of consecutive primes in each of the 50 rows.

.

The Goldbach conjecture verification project reports that it has computed all primes below 4×10. That means 95,676,260,903,887,607 primes (nearly 10), but they were not stored. There are known formulae to evaluate the prime-counting function (the number of primes below a given value) faster than computing the primes. This has been used to compute that there are 1,925,320,391,606,803,968,923 primes (roughly 2) below 10. A different computation found that there are 18,435,599,767,349,200,867,866 primes (roughly 2) below 10, if the Riemann hypothesis is true.

Lists of primes by type 
Below are listed the first prime numbers of many named forms and types. More details are in the article for the name. n is a natural number (including 0) in the definitions.

Balanced primes 
Primes with equal-sized prime gaps above and below them, so that they are equal to the arithmetic mean of the nearest primes above and below.

 5, 53, 157, 173, 211, 257, 263, 373, 563, 593, 607, 653, 733, 947, 977, 1103, 1123, 1187, 1223, 1367, 1511, 1747, 1753, 1907, 2287, 2417, 2677, 2903, 2963, 3307, 3313, 3637, 3733,   4013, 4409, 4457, 4597, 4657, 4691, 4993, 5107, 5113, 5303, 5387, 5393 .

Bell primes 
Primes that are the number of partitions of a set with n members.

2, 5, 877, 27644437, 35742549198872617291353508656626642567, 359334085968622831041960188598043661065388726959079837.
The next term has 6,539 digits.

Chen primes 
Where p is prime and p+2 is either a prime or semiprime.

2, 3, 5, 7, 11, 13, 17, 19, 23, 29, 31, 37, 41, 47, 53, 59, 67, 71, 83, 89, 101, 107, 109, 113, 127, 131, 137, 139, 149, 157, 167, 179, 181, 191, 197, 199, 211, 227, 233, 239, 251, 257, 263, 269, 281, 293, 307, 311, 317, 337, 347, 353, 359, 379, 389, 401, 409

Circular primes 
A circular prime number is a number that remains prime on any cyclic rotation of its digits (in base 10).

2, 3, 5, 7, 11, 13, 17, 31, 37, 71, 73, 79, 97, 113, 131, 197, 199, 311, 337, 373, 719, 733, 919, 971, 991, 1193, 1931, 3119, 3779, 7793, 7937, 9311, 9377, 11939, 19391, 19937, 37199, 39119, 71993, 91193, 93719, 93911, 99371, 193939, 199933, 319993, 331999, 391939, 393919, 919393, 933199, 939193, 939391, 993319, 999331

Some sources only list the smallest prime in each cycle, for example, listing 13, but omitting 31 (OEIS really calls this sequence circular primes, but not the above sequence):

2, 3, 5, 7, 11, 13, 17, 37, 79, 113, 197, 199, 337, 1193, 3779, 11939, 19937, 193939, 199933, 1111111111111111111, 11111111111111111111111

All repunit primes are circular.

Cluster primes 
A cluster prime is a prime p such that every even natural number k ≤ p − 3 is the difference of two primes not exceeding p.

3, 5, 7, 11, 13, 17, 19, 23, ...

All odd primes between 3 and 89, inclusive, are cluster primes. The first 10 primes that are not cluster primes are:

2, 97, 127, 149, 191, 211, 223, 227, 229, 251.

Cousin primes 

Where (p, p + 4) are both prime.

(3, 7), (7, 11), (13, 17), (19, 23), (37, 41), (43, 47), (67, 71), (79, 83), (97, 101), (103, 107), (109, 113), (127, 131), (163, 167), (193, 197), (223, 227), (229, 233), (277, 281)

Cuban primes 
Of the form  where x = y + 1.

7, 19, 37, 61, 127, 271, 331, 397, 547, 631, 919, 1657, 1801, 1951, 2269, 2437, 2791, 3169, 3571, 4219, 4447, 5167, 5419, 6211, 7057, 7351, 8269, 9241, 10267, 11719, 12097, 13267, 13669, 16651, 19441, 19927, 22447, 23497, 24571, 25117, 26227, 27361, 33391, 35317

Of the form  where x = y + 2.

13, 109, 193, 433, 769, 1201, 1453, 2029, 3469, 3889, 4801, 10093, 12289, 13873, 18253, 20173, 21169, 22189, 28813, 37633, 43201, 47629, 60493, 63949, 65713, 69313, 73009, 76801, 84673, 106033, 108301, 112909, 115249

Cullen primes 
Of the form n×2 + 1.

3, 393050634124102232869567034555427371542904833

Dihedral primes 
Primes that remain prime when read upside down or mirrored in a seven-segment display.

2, 5, 11, 101, 181, 1181, 1811, 18181, 108881, 110881, 118081, 120121,
121021, 121151, 150151, 151051, 151121, 180181, 180811, 181081

Eisenstein primes without imaginary part 
Eisenstein integers that are irreducible and real numbers (primes of the form 3n − 1).

2, 5, 11, 17, 23, 29, 41, 47, 53, 59, 71, 83, 89, 101, 107, 113, 131, 137, 149, 167, 173, 179, 191, 197, 227, 233, 239, 251, 257, 263, 269, 281, 293, 311, 317, 347, 353, 359, 383, 389, 401

Emirps 
Primes that become a different prime when their decimal digits are reversed. The name "emirp" is obtained by reversing the word "prime".

13, 17, 31, 37, 71, 73, 79, 97, 107, 113, 149, 157, 167, 179, 199, 311, 337, 347, 359, 389, 701, 709, 733, 739, 743, 751, 761, 769, 907, 937, 941, 953, 967, 971, 983, 991

Euclid primes 
Of the form p# + 1 (a subset of primorial primes).

3, 7, 31, 211, 2311, 200560490131

Euler irregular primes 

19, 31, 43, 47, 61, 67, 71, 79, 101, 137, 139, 149, 193, 223, 241, 251, 263, 277, 307, 311, 349, 353, 359, 373, 379, 419, 433, 461, 463, 491, 509, 541, 563, 571, 577, 587

Euler (p, p − 3) irregular primes 
Primes  such that  is an Euler irregular pair.

149, 241, 2946901

Factorial primes 
Of the form n! − 1 or n! + 1.

2, 3, 5, 7, 23, 719, 5039, 39916801, 479001599, 87178291199, 10888869450418352160768000001, 265252859812191058636308479999999, 263130836933693530167218012159999999, 8683317618811886495518194401279999999

Fermat primes 
Of the form 2 + 1.

3, 5, 17, 257, 65537

 these are the only known Fermat primes, and conjecturally the only Fermat primes. The probability of the existence of another Fermat prime is less than one in a billion.

Generalized Fermat primes 
Of the form a + 1 for fixed integer a.

a = 2: 3, 5, 17, 257, 65537

a = 4: 5, 17, 257, 65537

a = 6: 7, 37, 1297

a = 8: (does not exist)

a = 10: 11, 101

a = 12: 13

a = 14: 197

a = 16: 17, 257, 65537

a = 18: 19

a = 20: 401, 160001

a = 22: 23

a = 24: 577, 331777

 these are the only known generalized Fermat primes for a ≤ 24.

Fibonacci primes 
Primes in the Fibonacci sequence F = 0, F = 1,
F = F + F.

2, 3, 5, 13, 89, 233, 1597, 28657, 514229, 433494437, 2971215073, 99194853094755497, 1066340417491710595814572169, 19134702400093278081449423917

Fortunate primes 
Fortunate numbers that are prime (it has been conjectured they all are).

3, 5, 7, 13, 17, 19, 23, 37, 47, 59, 61, 67, 71, 79, 89, 101, 103, 107, 109, 127, 151, 157, 163, 167, 191, 197, 199, 223, 229, 233, 239, 271, 277, 283, 293, 307, 311, 313, 331, 353, 373, 379, 383, 397

Gaussian primes 
Prime elements of the Gaussian integers; equivalently, primes of the form 4n + 3.

3, 7, 11, 19, 23, 31, 43, 47, 59, 67, 71, 79, 83, 103, 107, 127, 131, 139, 151, 163, 167, 179, 191, 199, 211, 223, 227, 239, 251, 263, 271, 283, 307, 311, 331, 347, 359, 367, 379, 383, 419, 431, 439, 443, 463, 467, 479, 487, 491, 499, 503

Good primes 
Primes p for which p > p p for all 1 ≤ i ≤ n−1, where p is the nth prime.

5, 11, 17, 29, 37, 41, 53, 59, 67, 71, 97, 101, 127, 149, 179, 191, 223, 227, 251, 257, 269, 307

Happy primes 
Happy numbers that are prime.

7, 13, 19, 23, 31, 79, 97, 103, 109, 139, 167, 193, 239, 263, 293, 313, 331, 367, 379, 383, 397, 409, 487, 563, 617, 653, 673, 683, 709, 739, 761, 863, 881, 907, 937, 1009, 1033, 1039, 1093

Harmonic primes 
Primes p for which there are no solutions to H ≡ 0 (mod p) and H ≡ −ω (mod p) for 1 ≤ k ≤ p−2, where H denotes the k-th harmonic number and ω denotes the Wolstenholme quotient.

5, 13, 17, 23, 41, 67, 73, 79, 107, 113, 139, 149, 157, 179, 191, 193, 223, 239, 241, 251, 263, 277, 281, 293, 307, 311, 317, 331, 337, 349

Higgs primes for squares 
Primes p for which p − 1 divides the square of the product of all earlier terms.

2, 3, 5, 7, 11, 13, 19, 23, 29, 31, 37, 43, 47, 53, 59, 61, 67, 71, 79, 101, 107, 127, 131, 139, 149, 151, 157, 173, 181, 191, 197, 199, 211, 223, 229, 263, 269, 277, 283, 311, 317, 331, 347, 349

Highly cototient primes 
Primes that are a cototient more often than any integer below it except 1.

2, 23, 47, 59, 83, 89, 113, 167, 269, 389, 419, 509, 659, 839, 1049, 1259, 1889

Home primes 

2, 3, 211, 5, 23, 7, 3331113965338635107, 311, 773, 11, 223, 13, 13367, 1129, 31636373, 17, 233, 19, 3318308475676071413, 37, 211, 23, 331319, 773, 3251, 13367, 227, 29, 547, 31, 241271, 311, 31397, 1129, 71129, 37, 373, 313, 3314192745739, 41, 379, 43, 22815088913, 3411949, 223, 47, 6161791591356884791277

Irregular primes 
Odd primes p that divide the class number of the p-th cyclotomic field.

37, 59, 67, 101, 103, 131, 149, 157, 233, 257, 263, 271, 283, 293, 307, 311, 347, 353, 379, 389, 401, 409, 421, 433, 461, 463, 467, 491, 523, 541, 547, 557, 577, 587, 593, 607, 613

(p, p − 3) irregular primes 

(See Wolstenholme prime)

(p, p − 5) irregular primes 
Primes p such that (p, p−5) is an irregular pair.

37

(p, p − 9) irregular primes 
Primes p such that (p, p − 9) is an irregular pair.

67, 877

Isolated primes 
Primes p such that neither p − 2 nor p + 2 is prime.

2, 23, 37, 47, 53, 67, 79, 83, 89, 97, 113, 127, 131, 157, 163, 167, 173, 211, 223, 233, 251, 257, 263, 277, 293, 307, 317, 331, 337, 353, 359, 367, 373, 379, 383, 389, 397, 401, 409, 439, 443, 449, 457, 467, 479, 487, 491, 499, 503, 509, 541, 547, 557, 563, 577, 587, 593, 607, 613, 631, 647, 653, 673, 677, 683, 691, 701, 709, 719, 727, 733, 739, 743, 751, 757, 761, 769, 773, 787, 797, 839, 853, 863, 877, 887, 907, 911, 919, 929, 937, 941, 947, 953, 967, 971, 977, 983, 991, 997

Leyland primes 
Of the form x + y, with 1 < x < y.

17, 593, 32993, 2097593, 8589935681, 59604644783353249, 523347633027360537213687137, 43143988327398957279342419750374600193

Long primes 
Primes p for which, in a given base b,  gives a cyclic number. They are also called full reptend primes. Primes p for base 10:

7, 17, 19, 23, 29, 47, 59, 61, 97, 109, 113, 131, 149, 167, 179, 181, 193, 223, 229, 233, 257, 263, 269, 313, 337, 367, 379, 383, 389, 419, 433, 461, 487, 491, 499, 503, 509, 541, 571, 577, 593

Lucas primes 
Primes in the Lucas number sequence L = 2, L = 1,
L = L + L.

2, 3, 7, 11, 29, 47, 199, 521, 2207, 3571, 9349, 3010349, 54018521, 370248451, 6643838879, 119218851371, 5600748293801, 688846502588399, 32361122672259149

Lucky primes 
Lucky numbers that are prime.

3, 7, 13, 31, 37, 43, 67, 73, 79, 127, 151, 163, 193, 211, 223, 241, 283, 307, 331, 349, 367, 409, 421, 433, 463, 487, 541, 577, 601, 613, 619, 631, 643, 673, 727, 739, 769, 787, 823, 883, 937, 991, 997

Mersenne primes 
Of the form 2 − 1.

3, 7, 31, 127, 8191, 131071, 524287, 2147483647, 2305843009213693951, 618970019642690137449562111, 162259276829213363391578010288127, 170141183460469231731687303715884105727

, there are 51 known Mersenne primes. The 13th, 14th, and 51st have respectively 157, 183, and 24,862,048 digits.

, this class of prime numbers also contains the largest known prime: M82589933, the 51st known Mersenne prime.

Mersenne divisors 
Primes p that divide 2 − 1, for some prime number n.

3, 7, 23, 31, 47, 89, 127, 167, 223, 233, 263, 359, 383, 431, 439, 479, 503, 719, 839, 863, 887, 983, 1103, 1319, 1367, 1399, 1433, 1439, 1487, 1823, 1913, 2039, 2063, 2089, 2207, 2351, 2383, 2447, 2687, 2767, 2879, 2903, 2999, 3023, 3119, 3167, 3343

All Mersenne primes are, by definition, members of this sequence.

Mersenne prime exponents 
Primes p such that 2 − 1 is prime.

2, 3, 5, 7, 13, 17, 19, 31, 61, 89,

107, 127, 521, 607, 1279, 2203, 2281, 3217, 4253, 4423,

9689, 9941, 11213, 19937, 21701, 23209, 44497, 86243, 110503, 132049,

216091, 756839, 859433, 1257787, 1398269, 2976221, 3021377, 6972593, 13466917, 20996011,

24036583, 25964951, 30402457, 32582657, 37156667, 42643801, 43112609, 57885161

, three more are known to be in the sequence, but it is not known whether they are the next:
74207281, 77232917, 82589933

Double Mersenne primes 
A subset of Mersenne primes of the form 2 − 1 for prime p.

7, 127, 2147483647, 170141183460469231731687303715884105727 (primes in )

Generalized repunit primes 
Of the form (a − 1) / (a − 1) for fixed integer a.

For a = 2, these are the Mersenne primes, while for a = 10 they are the repunit primes.  For other small a, they are given below:

a = 3: 13, 1093, 797161, 3754733257489862401973357979128773, 6957596529882152968992225251835887181478451547013

a = 4: 5 (the only prime for a = 4)

a = 5: 31, 19531, 12207031, 305175781, 177635683940025046467781066894531, 14693679385278593849609206715278070972733319459651094018859396328480215743184089660644531

a = 6: 7, 43, 55987, 7369130657357778596659, 3546245297457217493590449191748546458005595187661976371

a = 7: 2801, 16148168401, 85053461164796801949539541639542805770666392330682673302530819774105141531698707146930307290253537320447270457

a = 8: 73 (the only prime for a = 8)

a = 9: none exist

Other generalizations and variations 
Many generalizations of Mersenne primes have been defined.  This include the following:
 Primes of the form , including the Mersenne primes and the cuban primes as special cases
 Williams primes, of the form

Mills primes 
Of the form ⌊θ⌋, where θ is Mills' constant. This form is prime for all positive integers n.

2, 11, 1361, 2521008887, 16022236204009818131831320183

Minimal primes 
Primes for which there is no shorter sub-sequence of the decimal digits that form a prime. There are exactly 26 minimal primes:

2, 3, 5, 7, 11, 19, 41, 61, 89, 409, 449, 499, 881, 991, 6469, 6949, 9001, 9049, 9649, 9949, 60649, 666649, 946669, 60000049, 66000049, 66600049

Newman–Shanks–Williams primes 
Newman–Shanks–Williams numbers that are prime.

7, 41, 239, 9369319, 63018038201, 489133282872437279, 19175002942688032928599

Non-generous primes 
Primes p for which the least positive primitive root is not a primitive root of p2.  Three such primes are known; it is not known whether there are more.

2, 40487, 6692367337

Palindromic primes 
Primes that remain the same when their decimal digits are read backwards.

2, 3, 5, 7, 11, 101, 131, 151, 181, 191, 313, 353, 373, 383, 727, 757, 787, 797, 919, 929, 10301, 10501, 10601, 11311, 11411, 12421, 12721, 12821, 13331, 13831, 13931, 14341, 14741

Palindromic wing primes 
This means all digits except the middle digit are equal.

101, 131, 151, 181, 191, 313, 353, 373, 383, 727, 757, 787, 797, 919, 929, 11311, 11411, 33533, 77377, 77477, 77977, 1114111, 1117111, 3331333, 3337333, 7772777, 7774777, 7778777, 111181111, 111191111, 777767777, 77777677777, 99999199999

Partition primes 
Partition function values that are prime.

2, 3, 5, 7, 11, 101, 17977, 10619863, 6620830889, 80630964769, 228204732751, 1171432692373, 1398341745571, 10963707205259, 15285151248481, 10657331232548839, 790738119649411319, 18987964267331664557

Pell primes 
Primes in the Pell number sequence P = 0, P = 1,
P = 2P + P.

2, 5, 29, 5741, 33461, 44560482149, 1746860020068409, 68480406462161287469, 13558774610046711780701, 4125636888562548868221559797461449

Permutable primes 
Any permutation of the decimal digits is a prime.

2, 3, 5, 7, 11, 13, 17, 31, 37, 71, 73, 79, 97, 113, 131, 199, 311, 337, 373, 733, 919, 991, 1111111111111111111, 11111111111111111111111

Perrin primes 
Primes in the Perrin number sequence P(0) = 3, P(1) = 0, P(2) = 2,
P(n) = P(n−2) + P(n−3).

2, 3, 5, 7, 17, 29, 277, 367, 853, 14197, 43721, 1442968193, 792606555396977, 187278659180417234321, 66241160488780141071579864797

Pierpont primes 
Of the form 23 + 1 for some integers u,v ≥ 0.

These are also class 1- primes.

2, 3, 5, 7, 13, 17, 19, 37, 73, 97, 109, 163, 193, 257, 433, 487, 577, 769, 1153, 1297, 1459, 2593, 2917, 3457, 3889, 10369, 12289, 17497, 18433, 39367, 52489, 65537, 139969, 147457

Pillai primes 
Primes p for which there exist n > 0 such that p divides n! + 1 and n does not divide p − 1.

23, 29, 59, 61, 67, 71, 79, 83, 109, 137, 139, 149, 193, 227, 233, 239, 251, 257, 269, 271, 277, 293, 307, 311, 317, 359, 379, 383, 389, 397, 401, 419, 431, 449, 461, 463, 467, 479, 499

Primes of the form n4 + 1 
Of the form n4 + 1.

2, 17, 257, 1297, 65537, 160001, 331777, 614657, 1336337, 4477457, 5308417, 8503057, 9834497, 29986577, 40960001, 45212177, 59969537, 65610001, 126247697, 193877777, 303595777, 384160001, 406586897, 562448657, 655360001

Primeval primes 
Primes for which there are more prime permutations of some or all the decimal digits than for any smaller number.

2, 13, 37, 107, 113, 137, 1013, 1237, 1367, 10079

Primorial primes 
Of the form p# ± 1.

Proth primes 
Of the form k×2 + 1, with odd k and k < 2.

3, 5, 13, 17, 41, 97, 113, 193, 241, 257, 353, 449, 577, 641, 673, 769, 929, 1153, 1217, 1409, 1601, 2113, 2689, 2753, 3137, 3329, 3457, 4481, 4993, 6529, 7297, 7681, 7937, 9473, 9601, 9857

Pythagorean primes 
Of the form 4n + 1.

5, 13, 17, 29,  37, 41, 53, 61, 73, 89, 97, 101, 109, 113, 137, 149, 157, 173, 181, 193, 197, 229, 233, 241, 257, 269, 277, 281, 293, 313, 317, 337, 349, 353, 373, 389, 397, 401, 409, 421, 433, 449

Prime quadruplets 

Where (p, p+2, p+6, p+8) are all prime.

(5, 7, 11, 13), (11, 13, 17, 19), (101, 103, 107, 109), (191, 193, 197, 199), (821, 823, 827, 829), (1481, 1483, 1487, 1489), (1871, 1873, 1877, 1879), (2081, 2083, 2087, 2089), (3251, 3253, 3257, 3259), (3461, 3463, 3467, 3469), (5651, 5653, 5657, 5659), (9431, 9433, 9437, 9439)

Quartan primes 
Of the form x + y, where x,y > 0.

2, 17, 97, 257, 337, 641, 881

Ramanujan primes 
Integers R that are the smallest to give at least n primes from x/2 to x for all x ≥ R (all such integers are primes).

2, 11, 17, 29, 41, 47, 59, 67, 71, 97, 101, 107, 127, 149, 151, 167, 179, 181, 227, 229, 233, 239, 241, 263, 269, 281, 307, 311, 347, 349, 367, 373, 401, 409, 419, 431, 433, 439, 461, 487, 491

Regular primes 
Primes p that do not divide the class number of the p-th cyclotomic field.

3, 5, 7, 11, 13, 17, 19, 23, 29, 31, 41, 43, 47, 53, 61, 71, 73, 79, 83, 89, 97, 107, 109, 113, 127, 137, 139, 151, 163, 167, 173, 179, 181, 191, 193, 197, 199, 211, 223, 227, 229, 239, 241, 251, 269, 277, 281

Repunit primes 
Primes containing only the decimal digit 1.

11, 1111111111111111111 (19 digits), 11111111111111111111111  (23 digits)

The next have 317, 1031, 49081, 86453, 109297, 270343 digits

Residue classes of primes 
Of the form an + d for fixed integers a and d. Also called primes congruent to d modulo a.

The primes of the form 2n+1 are the odd primes, including all primes other than 2.  Some sequences have alternate names: 4n+1 are Pythagorean primes, 4n+3 are the integer Gaussian primes, and 6n+5 are the Eisenstein primes (with 2 omitted).  The classes 10n+d (d = 1, 3, 7, 9) are primes ending in the decimal digit d.

2n+1: 3, 5, 7, 11, 13, 17, 19, 23, 29, 31, 37, 41, 43, 47, 53
4n+1: 5, 13, 17, 29, 37, 41, 53, 61, 73, 89, 97, 101, 109, 113, 137
4n+3: 3, 7, 11, 19, 23, 31, 43, 47, 59, 67, 71, 79, 83, 103, 107
6n+1: 7, 13, 19, 31, 37, 43, 61, 67, 73, 79, 97, 103, 109, 127, 139
6n+5: 5, 11, 17, 23, 29, 41, 47, 53, 59, 71, 83, 89, 101, 107, 113
8n+1: 17, 41, 73, 89, 97, 113, 137, 193, 233, 241, 257, 281, 313, 337, 353
8n+3: 3, 11, 19, 43, 59, 67, 83, 107, 131, 139, 163, 179, 211, 227, 251
8n+5: 5, 13, 29, 37, 53, 61, 101, 109, 149, 157, 173, 181, 197, 229, 269
8n+7: 7, 23, 31, 47, 71, 79, 103, 127, 151, 167, 191, 199, 223, 239, 263
10n+1: 11, 31, 41, 61, 71, 101, 131, 151, 181, 191, 211, 241, 251, 271, 281
10n+3: 3, 13, 23, 43, 53, 73, 83, 103, 113, 163, 173, 193, 223, 233, 263
10n+7: 7, 17, 37, 47, 67, 97, 107, 127, 137, 157, 167, 197, 227, 257, 277
10n+9: 19, 29, 59, 79, 89, 109, 139, 149, 179, 199, 229, 239, 269, 349, 359
12n+1: 13, 37, 61, 73, 97, 109, 157, 181, 193, 229, 241, 277, 313, 337, 349
12n+5: 5, 17, 29, 41, 53, 89, 101, 113, 137, 149, 173, 197, 233, 257, 269
12n+7: 7, 19, 31, 43, 67, 79, 103, 127, 139, 151, 163, 199, 211, 223, 271
12n+11: 11, 23, 47, 59, 71, 83, 107, 131, 167, 179, 191, 227, 239, 251, 263

Safe primes 
Where p and (p−1) / 2 are both prime.

5, 7, 11, 23, 47, 59, 83, 107, 167, 179, 227, 263, 347, 359, 383, 467, 479, 503, 563, 587, 719, 839, 863, 887, 983, 1019, 1187, 1283, 1307, 1319, 1367, 1439, 1487, 1523, 1619, 1823, 1907

Self primes in base 10 
Primes that cannot be generated by any integer added to the sum of its decimal digits.

3, 5, 7, 31, 53, 97, 211, 233, 277, 367, 389, 457, 479, 547, 569, 613, 659, 727, 839, 883, 929, 1021, 1087, 1109, 1223, 1289, 1447, 1559, 1627, 1693, 1783, 1873

Sexy primes 
Where (p, p + 6) are both prime.

(5, 11), (7, 13), (11, 17), (13, 19), (17, 23), (23, 29), (31, 37), (37, 43), (41, 47), (47, 53), (53, 59), (61, 67), (67, 73), (73, 79), (83, 89), (97, 103), (101, 107), (103, 109), (107, 113), (131, 137), (151, 157), (157, 163), (167, 173), (173, 179), (191, 197), (193, 199)

Smarandache–Wellin primes 
Primes that are the concatenation of the first n primes written in decimal.

2, 23, 2357

The fourth Smarandache-Wellin prime is the 355-digit concatenation of the first 128 primes that end with 719.

Solinas primes 
Of the form 2 ± 2 ± 1, where 0 < b < a.

3, 5, 7, 11, 13

Sophie Germain primes 
Where p and 2p + 1 are both prime. A Sophie Germain prime has a corresponding safe prime.

2, 3, 5, 11, 23, 29, 41, 53, 83, 89, 113, 131, 173, 179, 191, 233, 239, 251, 281, 293, 359, 419, 431, 443, 491, 509, 593, 641, 653, 659, 683, 719, 743, 761, 809, 911, 953

Stern primes 
Primes that are not the sum of a smaller prime and twice the square of a nonzero integer.

2, 3, 17, 137, 227, 977, 1187, 1493

, these are the only known Stern primes, and possibly the only existing.

Super-primes 
Primes with a prime index in the sequence of prime numbers (the 2nd, 3rd, 5th, ... prime).

3, 5, 11, 17, 31, 41, 59, 67, 83, 109, 127, 157, 179, 191, 211, 241, 277, 283, 331, 353, 367, 401, 431, 461, 509, 547, 563, 587, 599, 617, 709, 739, 773, 797, 859, 877, 919, 967, 991

Supersingular primes 
There are exactly fifteen supersingular primes:

2, 3, 5, 7, 11, 13, 17, 19, 23, 29, 31, 41, 47, 59, 71

Thabit primes 
Of the form 3×2 − 1.

2, 5, 11, 23, 47, 191, 383, 6143, 786431, 51539607551, 824633720831, 26388279066623, 108086391056891903, 55340232221128654847, 226673591177742970257407

The primes of the form 3×2 + 1 are related.

7, 13, 97, 193, 769, 12289, 786433, 3221225473, 206158430209, 6597069766657

Prime triplets 

Where (p, p+2, p+6) or (p, p+4, p+6) are all prime.

(5, 7, 11), (7, 11, 13), (11, 13, 17), (13, 17, 19), (17, 19, 23), (37, 41, 43), (41, 43, 47), (67, 71, 73), (97, 101, 103), (101, 103, 107), (103, 107, 109), (107, 109, 113), (191, 193, 197), (193, 197, 199), (223, 227, 229), (227, 229, 233), (277, 281, 283), (307, 311, 313), (311, 313, 317), (347, 349, 353)

Truncatable prime

Left-truncatable 
Primes that remain prime when the leading decimal digit is successively removed.

2, 3, 5, 7, 13, 17, 23, 37, 43, 47, 53, 67, 73, 83, 97, 113, 137, 167, 173, 197, 223, 283, 313, 317, 337, 347, 353, 367, 373, 383, 397, 443, 467, 523, 547, 613, 617, 643, 647, 653, 673, 683

Right-truncatable 
Primes that remain prime when the least significant decimal digit is successively removed.

2, 3, 5, 7, 23, 29, 31, 37, 53, 59, 71, 73, 79, 233, 239, 293, 311, 313, 317, 373, 379, 593, 599, 719, 733, 739, 797, 2333, 2339, 2393, 2399, 2939, 3119, 3137, 3733, 3739, 3793, 3797

Two-sided 
Primes that are both left-truncatable and right-truncatable. There are exactly fifteen two-sided primes:

2, 3, 5, 7, 23, 37, 53, 73, 313, 317, 373, 797, 3137, 3797, 739397

Twin primes 

Where (p, p+2) are both prime.

(3, 5), (5, 7), (11, 13), (17, 19), (29, 31), (41, 43), (59, 61), (71, 73), (101, 103), (107, 109), (137, 139), (149, 151), (179, 181), (191, 193), (197, 199), (227, 229), (239, 241), (269, 271), (281, 283), (311, 313), (347, 349), (419, 421), (431, 433), (461, 463)

Unique primes 
The list of primes p for which the period length of the decimal expansion of 1/p is unique (no other prime gives the same period).

3, 11, 37, 101, 9091, 9901, 333667, 909091, 99990001, 999999000001, 9999999900000001, 909090909090909091, 1111111111111111111, 11111111111111111111111, 900900900900990990990991

Wagstaff primes 
Of the form (2 + 1) / 3.

3, 11, 43, 683, 2731, 43691, 174763, 2796203, 715827883, 2932031007403, 768614336404564651, 201487636602438195784363, 845100400152152934331135470251, 56713727820156410577229101238628035243

Values of n:

3, 5, 7, 11, 13, 17, 19, 23, 31, 43, 61, 79, 101, 127, 167, 191, 199, 313, 347, 701, 1709, 2617, 3539, 5807, 10501, 10691, 11279, 12391, 14479, 42737, 83339, 95369, 117239, 127031, 138937, 141079, 267017, 269987, 374321

Wall–Sun–Sun primes 
A prime p > 5, if p divides the Fibonacci number , where the Legendre symbol  is defined as

, no Wall-Sun-Sun primes are known.

Weakly prime numbers 
Primes that having any one of their (base 10) digits changed to any other value will always result in a composite number.

294001, 505447, 584141, 604171, 971767, 1062599, 1282529, 1524181, 2017963, 2474431, 2690201, 3085553, 3326489, 4393139

Wieferich primes 
Primes p such that  for fixed integer a > 1.

2p − 1 ≡ 1 (mod p2): 1093, 3511
3p − 1 ≡ 1 (mod p2): 11, 1006003
4p − 1 ≡ 1 (mod p2): 1093, 3511
5p − 1 ≡ 1 (mod p2): 2, 20771, 40487, 53471161, 1645333507, 6692367337, 188748146801
6p − 1 ≡ 1 (mod p2): 66161, 534851, 3152573
7p − 1 ≡ 1 (mod p2): 5, 491531
8p − 1 ≡ 1 (mod p2): 3, 1093, 3511
9p − 1 ≡ 1 (mod p2): 2, 11, 1006003
10p − 1 ≡ 1 (mod p2): 3, 487, 56598313
11p − 1 ≡ 1 (mod p2): 71
12p − 1 ≡ 1 (mod p2): 2693, 123653
13p − 1 ≡ 1 (mod p2): 2, 863, 1747591
14p − 1 ≡ 1 (mod p2): 29, 353, 7596952219
15p − 1 ≡ 1 (mod p2): 29131, 119327070011
16p − 1 ≡ 1 (mod p2): 1093, 3511
17p − 1 ≡ 1 (mod p2): 2, 3, 46021, 48947
18p − 1 ≡ 1 (mod p2): 5, 7, 37, 331, 33923, 1284043
19p − 1 ≡ 1 (mod p2): 3, 7, 13, 43, 137, 63061489
20p − 1 ≡ 1 (mod p2): 281, 46457, 9377747, 122959073
21p − 1 ≡ 1 (mod p2): 2
22p − 1 ≡ 1 (mod p2): 13, 673, 1595813, 492366587, 9809862296159
23p − 1 ≡ 1 (mod p2): 13, 2481757, 13703077, 15546404183, 2549536629329
24p − 1 ≡ 1 (mod p2): 5, 25633
25p − 1 ≡ 1 (mod p2): 2, 20771, 40487, 53471161, 1645333507, 6692367337, 188748146801

, these are all known Wieferich primes with a ≤ 25.

Wilson primes 
Primes p for which p divides (p−1)! + 1.

5, 13, 563

, these are the only known Wilson primes.

Wolstenholme primes 
Primes p for which the binomial coefficient 

16843, 2124679

, these are the only known Wolstenholme primes.

Woodall primes 
Of the form n×2 − 1.

7, 23, 383, 32212254719, 2833419889721787128217599, 195845982777569926302400511, 4776913109852041418248056622882488319

See also

References

External links 
 Lists of Primes at the Prime Pages.
 The Nth Prime Page Nth prime through n=10^12, pi(x) through x=3*10^13, Random prime in same range.
 Prime Numbers List Full list for prime numbers below 10,000,000,000, partial list for up to 400 digits.
 Interface to a list of the first 98 million primes (primes less than 2,000,000,000)
 
 Selected prime related sequences in OEIS.
 Fischer, R. Thema: Fermatquotient B^(P−1) == 1 (mod P^2)  (Lists Wieferich primes in all bases up to 1052)
 

Prime numbers
Prime